Milan Đokić (born 12 September 1997) is a Serbian football centre-forward who plays for Macedonian club Bregalnica Štip.

References

External links
 
 

1997 births
Sportspeople from Leskovac
Living people
Association football forwards
Serbian footballers
FK Spartak Subotica players
FK TSC Bačka Topola players
FK ČSK Čelarevo players
FK Bačka 1901 players
FK Moravac Mrštane players
FK Zlatibor Čajetina players
FK Bregalnica Štip players
Serbian First League players
Serbian SuperLiga players
Macedonian First Football League players
Serbian expatriate footballers
Expatriate footballers in North Macedonia
Serbian expatriate sportspeople in North Macedonia